The Black is a rock band from Austin, Texas that formed in 2002 when singer/songwriter David Longoria began collaborating with drummer Andy Morales.  The two were later joined by renowned guitarist Alan Schaefer (son of famous guitar maker Ed Schaefer) and Nick Moulos of the Austin band The Crackpipes.

History 

Their full-length album Tanglewood was recorded in 2004 and released the spring of 2005 on their own record label K Woo.

The band's next release, titled Donna, was released in the summer of 2007.

Discography

Studio albums 
 Tanglewood (20 April 2005)
 Donna EP (30 July 2007)
Little Hits/China (2009)
 Sun in the Day Moon at Night (12 October 2011)

Videos 
 Little Hits on YouTube.com
 Now I Am Here on YouTube.com

Members

Current 
 David Longoria – lyrics, vocals 2004–present
 Alan Schaefer – guitar 2004–present
 Matt Simon – drums present
 Bryan Mammel – Piano, keys present
Amy Hawthorne -bass

Previous 
Drummers
Andy Morales – (2004)
Yamal Said-(2005)(2007)
Bassists
Clint Newsom – (2004)
Nick Moulos – (2004–2005)
Adam Amparan – (2005–2006)
Zach Hennard – (2006–2007)
Pink Nasty – (2007)

Pianists
Danica Newell – (2004)
Conrad Keely – (2005)
Jared Van Fleet – (2006–2007)

References 

 http://www.allmusic.com/artist/the-black-mn0002330102/biography 
 http://www.austinchronicle.com/gyrobase/AMDB/Profile?oid=oid:234583

External links 
 

Musical groups from Austin, Texas
Musical groups established in 2002
2002 establishments in Texas